Abdelkrim Ghallab (December 31, 1919, in Fes – August 14, 2017, in El Jadida) was a Moroccan political journalist, cultural commentator, and novelist. He is an important figure both in the literary and political field (editor of the Istiqlal Party daily al-Alam).

Early life
He studied both at the University of Al-Karaouine in Fez and at the University of Cairo, where he took his M.A. in Arabic literature. He is the author of five novels and three collections of short stories. Among his best known novels are Sab'ab Atwat ("Seven Gates", 1965) and Dafann al-m'd ("We buried the past", 1966); the latter is praised as representative of a new school of writing called "nationalist realism". According to Simon Gikandi his Arabic style is known for its "graceful and at times scholarly classicism".

Career
In 2000, the Union of Arab writers in Egypt included his novel Al-Mu`alîm `Ali (Master Alí) among the hundred best Arabic novels in history. In 2001, the Moroccan department of Culture published the complete works of Ghallab in five volumes. In 2004 he was awarded the Maghreb Culture prize of Tunis. His work has been translated in many languages.

Abdelkrim Ghallab died in El Jadida on August 14, 2017, aged 97.

Bibliography
al-A'mâl al-kâmila (5 Volumes). Manshűrât Wizârat al-Thaqâfa wa-l-Ittis:âl, 2001.
The first volume includes: Mât qarîr al-'ayn (I will die comforted, 1965); al-Sudd ; al-Ard: h:abibatî (my beloved earth, 1971); Waajradja-hâ min al-djanna (la sacó of paradise, 1971); Hâdhâ al-wadjh a'rifu-hâ (Conozco ese rostro, 1971).

The second volume is about the auto-biographical novel and includes: Sab'a abwâb (seven doors, 1984); Sifr al-takwîn (Génesis, 1996) and al-Shayjűja al-z:âlima (La injusta vejez, 1999).

The third volume, (novels) includes: Dafannâ al-mâd:î (The past is buried, 1966) and al-Mu' allim ' Alî (Ali the teacher).

The fourth volume includes: S:abâh:.. wa-yazh:af al-layl (For tomorrow...and the face of the night, 1984).

The fifth volume includes: Wa-'âda al-zawraq ilá al-nab (la barca volvió à la fuente, 1989) and Shurűh: fî l-marâyâ (Comentarios en el espejo, 1994).
Nabadat Fikr
Fi Athaqafa wa Al Adab
Fi Al Fikr A-ssiassi
Novels 
Dafana Al Madi
Lem'allem Ali
Akhrajaha mina Al Janna
Charqia fi baris (An oriental woman in Paris)
Translations in French
Le Passé enterré, (trad. Francis Gouin), Publisud, coll. « Confluents », Paris, 1990,

References

Seth Graebner, entry on Abdelkrim Ghallab, Encyclopedia of African Literature (ed. Simon Gikandi), 283.
Salim Jay, Dictionnaire des écrivains marocains. Casablanca: Eddif, 2005, 191-192
Wazzani, H:asan al- (ed). Dalîl al-Kuttâb al-Magâriba A`d:â` Ittih:âd Kuttâb al-Magrib. Rabat: Manshűrât Ittih:âd Kuttâb al-Magrib, 1993, 315-316.
Pilar Lirola Delgado "Abd al-Karim Gallab: una personalidad de la vida política y cultural marroquí" In: Al-Andalus Magreb: Estudios árabes e islámicos ISSN 1133-8571, Nº 7, 1999, pags. 135-168
Altona, Salih Jawad. “Ghallab as a committed writer and novelist”. Mundus Arabicus / Al-'Alam al-'Arabi, 1982, 2 35-52.
Ian Campbell, U of Mary Washington, Imprisonment, Servitude and Moroccan National Identity in Two Novels by Abdelkarim Ghallab (lecture)

External links
Ghallab, Abdelkrim (in Spanish) 
Interview with Abdelkarim Ghallab, Remembering for Tomorrow (publication of the European Cultural Foundation and Escuela de Traductores de Toledo, Annette van Beugen and Gonzalo Fernández Parrilla) about his autobiographical books The Seven Doors (Sab'at abwab), The Book of Formation, An Unjust Old Age (al-Shaykhukha alzalima) and Cairo Reveals its Secrets (al-Qahira tabuhu an asrariha). p. 59  N

1919 births
2017 deaths
Moroccan novelists
Male novelists
Moroccan essayists
Moroccan male writers
Male essayists
Istiqlal Party politicians
People from Fez, Morocco
Moroccan editors
University of al-Qarawiyyin alumni
Cairo University alumni
Member of the Academy of the Kingdom of Morocco
20th-century novelists